Armagh Borough (also known as Armagh City) was a constituency represented in the Irish House of Commons, the house of representatives of the Kingdom of Ireland, from 1613 to 1800.

History
This constituency was the borough of Armagh in County Armagh.

During the Commonwealth of England, Scotland and Ireland the borough was not granted separate representation in the Protectorate Parliaments (1654–1659), from the county constituency of Down, Antrim and Armagh.

After the restoration, in 1660, the Parliament of Ireland was revived with the borough again represented. In the Patriot Parliament of 1689 summoned by King James II, Armagh Borough was represented by two members.

The city of Armagh, County Armagh, was the episcopal seat of the primate of All Ireland, the Archbishop of Armagh. The sovereign of Armagh corporation was the primate's land agent, or the seneschal of the manor, making the constituency a bishop's borough. The other burgesses were clergymen, "who seem to have held on an express or implied stipulation to resign on quitting the diocese, or in case of their becoming unwilling to act under the archbishop's direction". As these clergymen naturally looked to the archbishop for preferment, it is improbable that there were many resignations under the last clause of the agreement; and a corporation so managed must have been as easy to control as through tenants who had taken an oath, and against whom, moreover, the agent had the additional lever of the "hanging gale" (rent arrears).

At Armagh, in the closing years of the old representative system, the archbishop although he was not a member of the corporation, and had no constitutional connection with it commanded twelve of the thirteen votes by which the members of Parliament for the city were elected; and "so completely was the election of the members considered to be in the primate, that he regularly paid the expenses of the admission of the free burgesses, amounting to five pounds each".

Following the Acts of Union 1800 the borough retained one parliamentary seat in the United Kingdom House of Commons.

Members of Parliament, 1613–1801
1613–1615 Marcus Ussher and Christopher Conway
1634–1635 John Dillon and William Hilton
1639–1649 William Dixon and Sir Archibald Hamilton, Bt
1661–1666 Hon Sir James Graham and Thomas Chambers

1689–1801

Notes

References

Bibliography

Politics of Armagh (city)
Constituencies of the Parliament of Ireland (pre-1801)
Historic constituencies in County Armagh
1613 establishments in Ireland
1800 disestablishments in Ireland
Constituencies established in 1613
Constituencies disestablished in 1800